Lacrima is the Latin word for tear. It may refer to:

 Lacrima (grape), a rare red wine grape variety native to the Marche region of Italy
 Asprinio Bianco or Lacrima, a white Italian wine grape variety grown primarily in southwest Italy around the Naples region of Campania
 Lacrima Christi, an Italian wine produced in the Campania region of Italy

See also
 
 Lacrimal (disambiguation)